Christian Ulrik Hansen (26 May 1921 – 23 June 1944) was a student of theology and member of the Danish resistance executed by the German occupying power.

Biography 

Hansen was born in Vannerup, Farsø on 26 May 1921 as the first child of American born farmer Arthur Jenning Hansen and wife Kristine Marie née Nielsen and baptized Kristian Ulrik Hansen in Farsø church on the fourth Sunday after Trinity.

In 1930 Hansen lived on a farm in Vannerup with his parents, two siblings, two laborers and a maid.

In 1935 Hansen was confirmed in Farsø church on the sixteenth Sunday after Trinity, still residing in Vannerup.

On 23 June 1944 Hansen and seven other members of the resistance were executed in Ryvangen.

After his death 
The January 1945 issue of the resistance newspaper Frit Danmark (Free Denmark) reported on the execution of the eight resistance members including Hansen.

On 9 July a memorial service was held for him in Vor Frue Kirke.

On 29 August Hansen and 105 other victims of the occupation were given a state funeral in the memorial park founded at the execution site in Ryvangen. Bishop Hans Fuglsang-Damgaard led the service with participation from the royal family, the government and representatives of the resistance movement.

References 

1921 births
1944 deaths
Danish people executed by Nazi Germany
Danish people of World War II
Danish resistance members
Resistance members killed by Nazi Germany
People from Vesthimmerland Municipality